Ganxsta ("Döglégy") Zolee (birthname  Zana Zoltán, nickname Blowfly) is a Hungarian rapper, drummer, performing artist and actor.

Biography
Zana Zoltán was born in Budapest in 1966.

Discography

as Ganxsta Zolee
 Sex Action (1990)
 Olcsó élvezet (1992)
 Mocskos élet (1993)
 Összeomlás (1994)
 Terror (1995)
 Sexact!on (1997)
 Hetedik (1999)
 Fehér és Zöld (2002)
 Jöhet bármi (2005)

Ganxsta Zolee and Kartel
Egyenesen a gettóból (1995)
Jégre teszlek (1997)
Helldorado (1999)
Rosszfiúk (2000)
Pokoli lecke (2001)
Gyilkosság Rt. (2002)
Greatest sHit (2003)
Szabad a gazda (2004)
Jubileumi album (2005)
Isten, Család, Sör (2007)
Amikor már azt hitted, hogy vége (2009)
Hatalmat a népnek (2012)
20 év, Tribute lemez (2015)
K.O. (2017)
Helldorado Újratöltve (2018)
OldSkool (2019)

Jack Jack
Jack Jack - The Band (2008)

EPs
Fehér hó (1996)
Argentin tangó (1998)
Isten, Család, Sör (2007)

Singles
A Jó a Rossz és a Kartel (Promo)
A való világ
Blow-Feld vs. O.J. Bond
Néhány jó dolog
Vato Loco
Mi vagyunk azok
H-O-K-I (Promo)
Route 66
Gerilla Funk
 Hasfalmetszők (1999)
 Nekem lámpást adott kezembe az Úr, Pesten (1999)
 Kiképzés - szinkronhang

Screen roles
 Jóban Rosszban (2008) 2 episodes (863. és 864. rész) - as himself
 Madagascar 2 (2008) – Moto Moto, voice-over

References

External links
https://web.archive.org/web/20050822080010/http://www.kartel.hu/

1966 births
Living people
Musicians from Budapest
Hungarian rappers
Gangsta rappers